Nueva Arcadia is a municipality in the Honduran department of Copán. La Entrada, with a population of 25,830 (2020 calculation), is the largest town in the municipality.

References 

Municipalities of the Copán Department